Finiani referred to the followers of Gianfranco Fini, when he was a leading member of The People of Freedom, a political party in Italy. They subsequently left the PdL to found Future and Freedom.

Factions or groups close to Fini included:
Generation Italy
FareFuturo
National Area
Open Space

The People of Freedom factions